Lower Turners Marsh is a rural locality in the local government areas of Launceston and George Town in the Launceston and North-east regions of Tasmania. The 2016 census determined a population of 37 for the state suburb of Lower Turners Marsh.

History
Lower Turners Marsh was gazetted as a locality in 1964.

Geography
Pipers River forms a small section of the eastern boundary.

Road infrastructure
Route B83 (Pipers River Road) passes through from south-east to north. The C811 route (Bangor Road) starts at an intersection with B83 and exits to the east. The C812 route (Old Bangor Tram Road) starts at an intersection with B83 and runs west through the locality before exiting.

References

Localities of City of Launceston
Localities of George Town Council
Towns in Tasmania